Rog-2000 (pronounced "Rahj-two-thousand", and sometimes spelled "ROG 2000") is a fictional robot that was the first professional creation of comic book artist-writer John Byrne. Rog-2000 serves as the mascot of Byrne Robotics.

Publication history

The character began life during Byrne's fan-artist days in the 1970s, as a spot illustration for Roger Stern and Bob Layton's fanzine CPL (Contemporary Pictorial Literature). Layton gave the character a name (riffing on the amount of "Rogers" – specifically Roger Stern and Roger Slifer – who contributed to CPL), and he and Stern began using him as a magazine mascot, with Byrne supplying additional art. A Rog-2000 story, "The Coming of the Gang", appeared in CPL #11 (1974), written by Stern with art by Byrne and Layton, and featuring caricatures of "the CPL Gang", including Byrne and fellow CPL contributor Duffy Vohland.

On the strength of that fan piece, Charlton Comics writer Nicola Cuti contacted Byrne about drawing the character for professional comic books. During this same period, the CPL Gang was producing the officially sanctioned fanzine Charlton Bullseye. Written by Cuti, "Rog-2000" became one of several alternating backup features in the Charlton Comics superhero series E-Man, starting with the eight-page "That Was No Lady" in issue #6 (Jan. 1975). This marked the color-comics debut of future industry star Byrne, who'd previously drawn a two-page story for Skywald Publications' black-and-white horror-comics magazine Nightmare #20 (Aug. 1974). The character also appeared the same month in the small-press hobbyist magazine The Comic Reader #44 (Jan. 1975).

As Byrne recalled the character's origin in a 2000 interview:

Three additional, seven-page "Rog-2000" stories – "Withering Heights", "The Wish", and "Rog. vs. The Sog", all by Cuti & Byrne – appeared in E-Man #7, 9–10 (March, July–Sept. 1975), respectively. All the Charlton stories were reprinted in Pacific Comics' ROG 2000 #1 (June 1982), as well as in A-Plus Comics' Hot 'N Cold Heroes #1 (1990) and Herbie #4-4 (1991).

In a 2000 interview, Byrne recalled that:

Stern was reunited with Rog-2000 when Charlton accepted two of his scripts for the feature, but the company then canceled E-Man the following workday.

References

External links
Rog 2000 at An International Catalogue of Superheroes. WebCitation archive.
Archive of Alec Tronn's E-Man Fan Page. Some graphics missing; scroll down and links still work. Original page.
Byrne Robotics (John Byrne official site). WebCitation archive.

Pacific Comics titles
Charlton Comics superheroes
Comics characters introduced in 1974
Fictional robots
Magazine mascots
Comics by John Byrne (comics)
Characters created by John Byrne (comics)
Male characters in comics
Male characters in advertising
1974 comics debuts
Mascots introduced in 1974